Seefeld-Kadolz is a town in the district of Hollabrunn in Lower Austria, Austria.

Geography
Seefeld-Kadolz lies in the Weinviertel in Lower Austria in the Pulkau valley. About 4.72 percent of the municipality is forested.

References

Cities and towns in Hollabrunn District